Calvin George Scott (born 3 September 1959), better known as Cocoa Tea, is a Jamaican  reggae singer and songwriter.

Biography 
Born in Rocky Point, Clarendon Parish, Jamaica, Cocoa Tea was popular in Jamaica from 1985, but has become successful worldwide since the 1990s. One of his most famous songs is "Rikers Island", which was later put into a ragga version by Nardo Ranks entitled "Me No Like Rikers Island" (featured on Dancehall Reggaespanol) which was released the same year as the original "Rikers Island". He also gained fame with the song "Young Lover".  He gained notoriety in March 2008 after releasing a song titled "Barack Obama" in support of the US Presidential candidate by the same name. Cocoa Tea's song "Jah Made Them That Way" from his 1984 album Rocking Dolly interpolates "Human Nature" by Michael Jackson and "Answer Mi Question" by Dillinger.

He initiated the annual New Year's Eve events Dancehall Jam Jam in 2003; It ran until 2009, with plans to resurrect it in 2015.

After recording for many of the top reggae labels including VP Records, Greensleeves Records and Ras Records, he started his own Roaring Lion label around 2000.

Discography

Albums 
 Weh Dem A Go Do...Can't Stop Cocoa Tea (1984), Volcano
 I Lost My Sonia (1985), Volcano
 Settle Down (1985), Corner Stone
 Mr. Coco Tea (1985), Corner Stone
 Sweet Sweet Coco Tea (1985), Blue Mountain
 The Marshall (1985), Jammy's
 Cocoa Tea (1986), Jimpy's
 Come Again (1987), Jammy's
 Rikers Island (1991), VP
 Rocking Dolly (1991), RAS
 Authorized (1991), Greensleeves
 Kingston Hot (1992), RAS
 I Am the Toughest (1992), VP 
 Weh Dem A Go Do - Can't Stop Cocoa Tea (1992), VP 
 One Up (1993), Greensleeves 
 Good Life (1994), VP 
 Sweet Love (1994), VP
 Tune In (1994), Greensleeves 
 Can't Live So (1994), Shanachie
 Come Love Me (1995), VP 
 Israel's King (1996), VP 
 Holy Mount Zion (1997), Motown
 One Way (1998), VP 
 Unforgettable (2000), Roaring Lion
 Feel the Power (2001), VP 
 Tek Weh Yuh Gal (2004), Kings of Kings
 Save Us Oh Jah (2006), VP 
 Biological Warfare (2007), Minor7Flat5
 Yes We Can (2009), Roaring Lion
 In a Di Red (2012), VP
 Sunset in Negril (2014), Roaring Lion

Split albums 
 Corner Stone Presents Clash Of The 80's (1986), Corner Stone - Cocoa Tea & Barrington Levy
 Clash (1985), Hawkeye - Tenor Saw & Cocoa Tea
 Showdown Vol 8 (1986), Hitbound - Frankie Paul & Cocoa Tea
 Another One for the Road (1991), Greensleeves - Home T, Cocoa Tea, and Cutty Ranks
 Holding On (1991), VP - Cocoa Tea, Shabba Ranks, and Home T, a.k.a. Pirate's Anthem 
 Sanchez Meets Cocoa Tea (1993), Jet Star - with Sanchez
 Legit (1993), Shananchie - Cocoa Tea, Freddie McGregor, and Dennis Brown
 Israel Vibration Meets Cocoa Tea (1999), Cactus
 Another One For The Road (Greensleeves 30th Anniversary Edition) (2007), Greensleeves - Home T, Cocoa Tea, and Cutty Ranks

Compilation albums 
 20 Tracks of Cocoa Tea (1991), Sonic Sounds
 RAS Portraits (1997), RAS.
 In His Early Days (1998), Corner Stone
 Best Of (1999), Socadisc
 Reggae Legends Vol 3 (1999), Artists Only
 Kings of Reggae (2002), Nocturne
 Live in Jamaica (2002), Sankofa
 Reggae Anthology: The Sweet Sound of Cocoa Tea (2008), 17 North Parade 
 Reggae Legends (2009), 17 North Parade 
 The Best of Cocoa Tea (2012), Jammy's
 Music is Our Business (2019), VP

In popular culture 
His song "We Do The Killing" was sampled in the Pendulum song "Set Me On Fire", which is included on their album Immersion.

References

External links 
 Cocoa Tea, Biography of Cocoa Tea
 Cocoa Tea, Artists Only! Records

1959 births
Living people
Jamaican dancehall musicians
Jamaican reggae musicians
People from Clarendon Parish, Jamaica
Greensleeves Records artists
VP Records artists